Spray School is a K-12 public school in Spray, Oregon, United States. The only school in the Spray School District, its campus consists of five buildings that house classrooms for students in kindergarten through grade 12, administrative offices, a café, a library, a media center, a woodshop, and a gymnasium. Across the street from the campus is a district-run dormitory for up to six high-school pupils, most of whom are exchange students.

Forty-four students from a district covering  are enrolled at Spray School for 2011–12. The district employs seven teachers, two instructional assistants, and one administrator.

History
In 1969 the school had 25 high school students, making it one of the smallest high school programs in Oregon.

Academics
In 2008, 89 percent of the school's seniors received their high school diploma. Of 9 students, 8 graduated, 0 dropped out, and 1 was still in high school.

Campus
The boarding facility has a cost of $100 per month per student for people resident in the United States.

References

School districts in Oregon
Education in Wheeler County, Oregon